Aleksandr Gennadyevich Anyukov (born 28 September 1982) is a Russian association football coach and a former player, who played as a right-back. He is an assistant coach with FC Zenit Saint Petersburg.

He made his senior debut in 2004, represented his nation for two European Championships and earned over 70 international appearances. He won the Russian Premier League with Zenit Saint Petersburg 5 times.

Club career 
Aleksandr Anyukov attended football school in Samara since the age of six. In 2000, he started playing for the reserve team of Krylia Sovetov Samara in the Second Division. He was noticed by Aleksandr Tarkhanov and invited to the first team. Anyukov debuted in the Russian Premier League on 14 October 2000 in a match against Zenit Saint Petersburg. He has played in Krylia Sovetov until mid-2005. During this time he became an international player. He has also appeared at Euro 2004.

In July 2005 Anyukov transferred to Zenit Saint Petersburg. He reached the quarterfinal of UEFA Cup 2005-06 and then won the UEFA Cup 2007-08 with them.

On 25 June 2019, Zenit announced that Anyukov has joined the team's coaching staff. On 14 July 2019 Anyukov came out of retirement to join Krylia Sovetov Samara on loan for the 2019–20 season.

On 28 May 2020, Krylia Sovetov announced that, despite the season being extended into July due to the COVID-19 pandemic in Russia, Anyukov's contract will not be extended and expire as originally planned on 31 May, and that he will return to Zenit to rejoin their coaching staff.

International
Anyukov made his international debut in May 2004 against Austria. He scored his first international goal in 2005 against Germany. Later Anyukov was called up to Russia's squad for Euro 2008.
He was confirmed for the finalized UEFA Euro 2012 squad on 25 May 2012.

Career statistics

Club

International goals

Honours

Club
Zenit Saint-Peterburg
 UEFA Cup: 2007–08
 Russian Premier League: 2007, 2010, 2011–12, 2014–15, 2018–19
 Russian Cup: 2009-10, 2015-16
 UEFA Super Cup: 2008
 Russian Super Cup: 2008, 2011, 2015, 2016

International
Russia
 UEFA European Championship bronze medalist: 2008

References

External links
Profile at the official FC Zenit St. Petersburg website
 
 Profile at the official FC Krylia Sovetov Samara website 
 

1982 births
Living people
Sportspeople from Samara, Russia
Association football defenders
Russian footballers
Russia under-21 international footballers
Russia national football B team footballers
Russia international footballers
PFC Krylia Sovetov Samara players
FC Zenit Saint Petersburg players
UEFA Cup winning players
FC Zenit-2 Saint Petersburg players
UEFA Euro 2004 players
Russian Premier League players
UEFA Euro 2008 players
UEFA Euro 2012 players